The 1974 San Jose Earthquakes season marked their debut as a franchise in the North American Soccer League. They finished second
in the Western Division and qualified for the playoffs.

Squad
The 1974 squad

Competitions

NASL

Match results

Season

Playoffs 

* = ShootoutSource:

Standings 
W = Wins, L = Losses, T= PK Shootout Wins, GF = Goals For, GA = Goals Against, PT= point system

6 points for a win,
3 points for a tie,
0 points for a loss,
1 point for each goal scored up to three per game.

References

External links
The Year in American Soccer – 1974 | NASL
San Jose Earthquakes Game Results | Soccerstats.us
San Jose Earthquakes Rosters | nasljerseys.com

San Jose Earthquakes seasons
San Jose Earthquakes
San Jose Earthquakes
1974 in sports in California